Conomurex fasciatus, common name the lined conch, is a species of sea snail, a marine gastropod mollusk in the family Strombidae, the true conchs.

Description
The shell size varies between 25 mm and 50 mm.

Has white basecolor and lines passing vertically on its body. The colors can range from different shades of brown to solid black. The crown and upper part is drill shaped.

Subspecies
Conomurex fasciatus dehelensis (var.) - Ostini & Rigoletti, 1983

Conomurex fasciatus elegans (var.) - Romagna-Manoja, E., 1973

Both subspecies occurs in the Red Sea.

Distribution
This species occurs in the Red Sea and the Persian Gulf.

References

Further reading
 Walls, J.G. (1980). Conchs, tibias and harps. A survey of the molluscan families Strombidae and Harpidae. T.F.H. Publications Ltd, Hong Kong.
 Vine, P. (1986). Red Sea Invertebrates. Immel Publishing, London. 224 pp

External links
 
 http://www.gastropods.com/4/Shell_9474.shtml
 http://www.gastropods.com/5/Shell_9475.shtml

Strombidae
Gastropods described in 1778